This is the progression of world record improvements of the 800 metres W65 division of Masters athletics.

Key

References

Masters Athletics 800 m list

Masters athletics world record progressions